Willie D. Nixon (October 29, 1916 – December 14, 1979) was an American baseball right fielder in the Negro leagues. 


Career
Nixon played with the Newark Eagles, Birmingham Black Barons, and Jacksonville Red Caps in 1940 and 1941.

References

Further reading
 News staff (April 21, 1940). "Black Barons to Play Baltimore Team Two Games at Rickwood". The Birmingham News. p. 29.
 News staff (June 13, 1940). "Black Barons to Play St. Louis Stars Here in Twin Bill Sunday". The Birmingham News. p. 27
 News staff (July 1, 1940). "Black Barons Break Even With Cleveland". The Birmingham News. p. 15
 News staff (May 5, 1941). "Birmingham Barons Defeat Eagles in Nightcap After Losing Opener". The Birmingham News. p. 14

External links
 and Seamheads

Newark Eagles players
Jacksonville Red Caps players
Birmingham Black Barons players
1916 births
1979 deaths
Baseball outfielders
Baseball players from Alabama
Sportspeople from Tuscaloosa, Alabama